Szabina Szlavikovics (born 5 September 1995) is an inactive Hungarian tennis player.

Szlavikovics has won four doubles titles on the ITF Circuit in her career. On 6 October 2014, she reached her best singles ranking of world No. 525. On 16 October 2017, she peaked at No. 575 in the doubles rankings.

Playing for Hungary Fed Cup team, Szlavikovics has a win–loss record of 1–1.

ITF finals

Singles: 2 (0–2)

Doubles: 9 (4–5)

Fed Cup participation

Singles

Doubles

References

External links

 
 
 

1995 births
Living people
People from Baja, Hungary
Hungarian female tennis players
Sportspeople from Bács-Kiskun County
21st-century Hungarian women